Smedjebacken is a locality and the seat of Smedjebacken Municipality, Dalarna County, Sweden, with 5,100 inhabitants in 2010.

Notable people

 Nils Ekholm, Swedish meteorologist, physicist and explorer
 Hans Heyerdahl, Norwegian painter
 Karl Edvard Laman, Swedish missionary and ethnographer

Sports
The following sports clubs are located in Smedjebacken:
 Smedjebackens FK

See also
Furbo, Smedjebacken

References

External links

Populated places in Dalarna County
Populated places in Smedjebacken Municipality